Marc Atkins is an English artist, photographer, filmmaker and poet, born in 1962, best known for his photography of cities and nudes, also commercially for music album and book covers.

Background 
Atkins attended Staffordshire College of Art and Design, gaining a Distinction; Cheltenham School of Art, receiving a First Class Honors Degree (in sculpture), followed by Postgraduate Studies at the Jan Van Eyck Academie, Netherlands (in performance, video, film and photography). After spending the subsequent year in Rome, he returned to London.

He then moved to Canada where, he became assistant professor at the University of Windsor, Ontario, during which time he travelled across North America. Since then, Atkins has lived and worked in London, but has also spent extended periods of time in Rome, New York, Warsaw and Paris.

Atkins has presented his work and ideas on the image at lectures and conferences at venues such as the Royal Academy, London, UEL School of Architecture, London, Royal College of Art, London, Instytut Mikołowski, Poland, the New York University Paris, The Photographers' Gallery, London, Université de Liège, Belgium and the Centre for Research in the Arts, Social Sciences, and Humanities, Cambridge University.

Atkins' work is exhibited regularly, and has been published and reviewed in books, magazines and newspapers worldwide, including V & A Magazine, Le Passant Ordinaire, Frieze, Negronia, Dwukropek, Performance Research, Porzucone twarze, Fotographia, and Hotshoe International.

As a commercial photographer has worked for many organisations, including The Art Fund, University of Cambridge, Vaughan Oliver / v23 and University of the Arts London. He has produced images for numerous CD and vinyl covers, including David Lynch ('Good Day Today' and 'I know'), The Breeders, TV on the Radio, Scott Walker and Jah Wobble, and also for over one hundred book-jackets, including Arthur Miller, Anaïs Nin, Joseph Conrad, Georges Bataille, R. L. Stevenson, Peter Ackroyd, D. H. Lawrence, A. L. Kennedy and Iain Sinclair. He has completed several video commissions, including music videos and short films on Byam Shaw School of Art and Central Saint Martins School of Art. His work is in many public and private collections. Several of his photographic portraits are in the collection of the National Portrait Gallery, London.

Bibliography 
"The Prism Walls" solo prose/poetry (Contraband Books )
"Still Moving" solo photography with poetry by Rod Mengham (Veer Books )
"The Logic of the Stairwell" solo prose/poetry (Shearsman Books )
"The Teratologists", solo photography (panoptika )
"Liquid City", solo photography with text by Iain Sinclair (Reaktion Books )
"Thirteen", solo photography with text by thirteen writers, including Julian Rathbone, Bill Drummond, James Sallis, Mick Farren, Stella Duffy and Nicholas Royle. (The Do-Not Press )
"Warszawa" solo photography with poetry by Tadeusz Pioro and Andrezj Sosnowski (Wig-press )
"The World's Top Photographers: Nudes”, also includes the work of Guy Bourdin, Bettina Rheims, Robert Mapplethorpe and Rankin (RotoVision )
"The Nude" also includes the work of Bill Brandt & Ralph Gibson (RotoVision )
"Faces of Mathematics", solo photography with introductions by Nick Gilbert, and also with text by the participants, including Sir Michael Atiyah. (panoptika )

Exhibitions
 2015 : Marc Atkins, in Liège (Belgium), Galerie Wittert, Collections artistiques de l'Université de Liège.

References

External links 
Marc Atkins website
Marc Atkins commercial photography
A selection of short films by Marc Atkins
Marc Atkins work at the National Portrait Gallery
Marc Atkins exhibition at Galeria FF
Marc Atkins exhibition at FABS
Rod Mengham / Saatchi on Marc Atkins
Exhibition "Marc Atkins" at Galerie Wittert, University of Liège

1962 births
Living people
Photographers from Staffordshire